NAV or Nav may refer to:

Government agencies 
 Norwegian Labour and Welfare Administration, Norwegian public welfare agency, the Norwegian abbreviation and common name is NAV.

Medicine and biology 
 Nav, voltage-gated sodium channels
 nerve-artery-vein (anatomy), when all these follow a common pathway
 Nomina Anatomica Veterinaria, veterinary textbook

Computers 
 Network allocation vector, a method to avoid collisions in a shared transmission medium
 Norton AntiVirus, antivirus software developed by Symantec Corporation
 Microsoft Dynamics NAV, an enterprise resource planning software product from Microsoft

Finance 
 Net asset value, a fund's price per share

Places 
 Nav, Afghanistan
 Nav, Iran (disambiguation)
 Nav (Slavic folklore), or Nawia, an underworld in Slavonic mythology

People
 Nav (rapper) (stylized as NAV), a Canadian rapper, singer, and record producer

Transportation 
 Nevşehir Kapadokya Airport, Nevşehir, Turkey, IATA airport code
 Navigation

Business 
 Net asset value, a term in finance

Other uses 
 Navajo language's ISO 639 code
 New Arabic Version, a translation of the Bible into Arabic
 Jav, Prav and Nav, three worlds in the Book of Veles